Afflicted is a 2013 Canadian found footage horror film written and directed by Derek Lee and Clif Prowse. Their feature film directorial debut, it had its world premiere on September 9, 2013 at the Toronto International Film Festival, where it won a special jury citation for Best Canadian First Feature Film. Lee and Prowse star as two friends whose goal to film themselves traveling the world is cut short when one of them contracts a mysterious disease.

Afflicted received a theatrical and video-on-demand release on April 4, 2014.

Plot
Childhood friends Clif Prowse and Derek Lee have decided to venture around the world to film their travel web series Ends of the Earth. The trip is Derek's last wish, as he has an AVM, which could cause his death at any moment.

Clif and Derek stop in Barcelona to meet with old friends Edo and Zach currently on tour with their band Unalaska. After their initially uneventful stay, Derek picks up a woman by the name of Audrey after telling her about his AVM. Later that night, the three burst into Derek's hotel room as a prank, only to discover Derek bleeding and semiconscious, and no sign of Audrey. Though Derek doesn't remember anything about the attack, they assume that Audrey planned to rob him. Clif and Derek part ways with Edo and Zach as they depart for Italy.

Upon arriving Derek passes out and sleeps for an entire day. The next afternoon the two visit the restaurant where Derek suddenly projectile vomits his meal. Later, at a vineyard, Derek has an extreme reaction to sunlight, and is forced to flee inside, covered in burns. Back at the hotel room, Clif attempts to calm Derek down, only for Derek to explosively punch clean through the corner of a stone wall with his bare hands.

Over the next few days, Derek displays superhuman strength, speed and agility. Clif attempts to persuade Derek to stop their trip and go home, but Derek continues to insist that there is nothing wrong with him. As Derek grows sicker due to not being able to eat, he finally agrees to go to a hospital. On the way, the two are almost hit by a car. Derek fights with the angry driver and passenger, completely overpowering them both. Then he licks their blood off his hand.

Clif correctly deduces that Derek has contracted vampirism, but researching it online proves unhelpful. Derek first tries drinking blood obtained from a butcher, and then kills and drinks the blood from someone's pet piglet, only to vomit out the blood on both occasions. Realizing that Derek needs human blood, he and Clif attempt to rob an ambulance, which proves unsuccessful, and they retreat back to the hotel. Derek enters a catatonic state, and Clif decides to cut his own arm to give Derek some human blood, but discovers that Derek has escaped. Clif attempts to find him, only to be ambushed and killed by the completely inhuman Derek. Upon regaining his senses and realizing that he has killed his friend, Derek shoots himself in the head with a shotgun. Shortly after, however, Derek's head heals with only slight scarring, and he is faced with the fact that he cannot die or be killed.

Soon after, Interpol agents attempt to take Derek into custody, forcing him to escape in daylight, carrying only Clif's camera bag. He manages to get back to France and hides in an abandoned warehouse in Paris. Reviewing the footage of his meeting with Audrey, he realizes that her cell phone might be at the hotel where she bit him. After retrieving the cell phone, Derek texts every one of the numbers on the contact list in order to try and lure someone to him. Eventually, he gets a reply from an unknown man offering to meet in person; Derek hides and tails him back to a squalid building. In the man's apartment, he finds a bloodstained saw and photographs, one of them showing an old black and white photograph of Audrey. Suddenly the man ambushes Derek from behind, but his superior strength enables him to overpower and restrain his attacker.  The man is revealed to be Maurice, an acquaintance of Audrey's who is bitter that Audrey turned Derek into a vampire but left him human. Derek sets up a live-stream camera showing Maurice tied up, in order to draw Audrey in. Maurice nevertheless warns Derek to leave before Audrey arrives and kills him. Suddenly, however, the apartment is stormed by the GIGN and Derek is shot to near-death before entering a frenzy state. After slaughtering the whole squad, Derek escapes once again.

Audrey finally comes to Derek in the abandoned building, where she attacks him and tells him not to approach her or Maurice ever again, before suddenly relinquishing this approach, telling Derek that he is not feeding properly. She tells the distraught Derek that there is no cure for his condition, adding that she would have cured herself if there were one, to which Derek responds by furiously lashing out at her. The two fight, but Derek is easily overpowered by the more experienced Audrey. Audrey urges him to feed every four to five days, lest he become inhuman again and turns into "something much worse", and starts to kill indiscriminately and daily. Audrey tells him that he cannot choose not to kill, but he can choose whom to kill, and explains that she chose Derek because she knew he was dying and thought she was being kind.

Later, Derek posts his final entry online, in which he explains that he can never contact his family again. He thereafter is shown filming himself feeding on a man who had videos on his cell phone of a sexual assault on a child.

In a mid-credits scene, somewhere in Italy, a teenage boy and two teenage girls are seen sneaking into a swimming pool, only to be attacked. The boy gets away, and with his camera running, finds the bloodied corpse of one of the girls, before Clif, now also a vampire, appears and attacks him.

Cast

Production
Filming took place in Barcelona, Paris, Italy, and Vancouver on a budget of $318,000. Funding was raised through a small grant and through Prowse and Lee's family and friends. Afflicted was their first feature-length film, as the two had previous only created short films together. The movie's original concept was initially planned to be a web series akin to Lonelygirl15 or Marble Hornets, where the two would make posts and upload videos that would seem ordinary but grow more bizarre over time. Of the concept, Prowse commented that "You'd eventually have all these gaps because eventually the characters would stop posting and then the feature film would be this skeleton key that would click at the very end that you'd present." They chose to make Derek's disease vampirism, as they felt that vampires are usually in "very stylized, cinematic, often melodramatic, and romanticized films" and were not traditionally filmed otherwise.

As the two were not familiar with filming in the found footage genre, Prowse and Lee found the filming challenging and commented that they had a lot of respect for the crews of films such as The Blair Witch Project and Paranormal Activity. They commented that their choice to star as the film's protagonists helped make the process easier, as it allowed them more freedom to shoot and re-shoot scenes. Lee commented that his role of "Derek" was very physically taxing due to the weather in Italy and the demands of the role.

Promotion
The film's trailer is notable for showing a selection of the characters' "travelogue" scenes in reverse order: Entry 206, Entry 185, Entry 163, Entry 151, and so on, each scene suggesting the horrors that are growing throughout the story. Germain Lussier of www.slashfilm.com wrote, "The Afflicted trailer might be one of the best "Hollywood" has released in a long time. Unlike traditional trailers, which are presented linearly, this one starts at the beginning, jumps to the end and works backward, showing how two friends' trip around the world goes horribly, horribly wrong."

Reception

Critical reviews for Afflicted have been mostly positive and as of October 14, 2019, the movie holds a rating of 83% on Rotten Tomatoes based on 30 reviews, with an average score of 6.70/10. The site's consensus reads: "It isn't without its share of clichés, but Afflicted proves there's still life in the found-footage horror genre". We Got This Covered rated the film favorably, as the film did not deal with "zombies, plagues, or flesh-eating viruses" and had "beautiful cinematography and clear, crisp pictures" as opposed to "swirling cameramen trying to give us motion sickness".

Box office
For its opening weekend, Afflicted opened in 44 theatres, and grossed $68,300, for an average of $1,552 per theatre. As of April 13, 2014, Afflicted has grossed $102,851.

Awards
Best Canadian First Feature Film - Special Jury Citation at the Toronto International Film Festival (2013, won) 
Maria Award for Best Special Effects at the Sitges - Catalan International Film Festival (2013, won) 
Maria Award for Best Motion Picture at the Sitges - Catalan International Film Festival (2013, nominated)
Best Director - Horror Features at the Austin Fantastic Fest (2013, won) 
Best Picture - Horror Features at the Austin Fantastic Fest (2013, won)
Best Screenplay - Horror Features at the Austin Fantastic Fest (2013, won)

References

External links
 
 

2013 films
2010s horror drama films
2013 horror films
Canadian supernatural horror films
Canadian horror drama films
Canadian vampire films
English-language Canadian films
Found footage films
Films shot in Barcelona
Films shot in Paris
Films shot in Italy
Films shot in Vancouver
CBS Films films
2013 directorial debut films
2013 drama films
2010s English-language films
2010s Canadian films